During the Napoleonic Wars, at least four French privateer ships were named Général Ernouf, for Jean Augustin Ernouf, the governor of the colony of Guadeloupe:

 Général Ernouf (General Erneuf in some British records; 1805 – 1805), was the former HMS Lilly, which the French captured in 1805. She cruised under Captains Giraud-Lapointe and Facio.
 Général Ernouf (1805–1808), was a Danish 16-gun brig, originally under the command of the notable French privateer captain Alexis Grassin. On 3 April 1806 she captured Ruckers, Soper, master, and sent her into Guadeloupe. On 9 August she captured Elizabeth, Murphy, master, as Elizabeth was sailing from Plymouth to Surinam, and sent her into Guadeloupe. On 10 October she captured the 10-gun schooner . On 15 September 1807 Général-Ernouf, under Grassin's command, captured the schooner . A few days later Général-Ernouf captured the slave ship . In February 1808 or so, Général Ernouf captured another slave ship, as Harriet was sailing from Africa to the West Indies, and possibly sent her into Cayenne.  captured Général Ernouf on 29 November 1808.
 Général Ernouf (1809–1809). French accounts state that the privateer's crew scuttled her to prevent her capture; Hazards captain, in his after-action letter, stated that he had sent in a boarding party that set fire to her.
 Général Ernouf (1810–1810), was a 6-gun brig.  HMS Freya (or Freija) captured her on 18 January 1810, though the prize-money announcement describes the privateer as of unknown name.

See also

Notes

Citations

References

 
 
 
La Nicollière-Teijeiro, Stephane (1896) Course et les corsaires du Port de Nantes: armements, combats, prises, pirateries, etc. (Honoré Champion).

Privateer ships of France
Captured ships
Ship names